Clarence Dunn Van Duzer (May 4, 1864 – September 28, 1947) an American attorney and politician who served as a United States representative from Nevada. He served in the Nevada Assembly.

Early life and education
Van Duzer was born Idaho City, Idaho, and attended public and private schools in Nevada and California. He attended the University of California, Berkeley before graduating from the University of Nevada, Reno in 1889. He also studied law at Georgetown University, graduating in 1893.

Career
In 1893, VanDuzer began to practice before the Supreme Court of the District of Columbia. In 1892, He was appointed by the Governor of Nevada to the position of State Land Agent. He served as private secretary to Senator Francis G. Newlands for five years.

Van Duzer returned to Nevada, where he worked in mining and practiced law. He was elected District Attorney of Humboldt County in 1898. He was a member of the Nevada Assembly from 1900 to 1902 and served as speaker. Elected and re-elected as a Democrat to the United States House of Representatives, he served from March 4, 1903, to March 3, 1907.

After leaving the House of Representatives, Van Duzer resumed mining. In 1922, he moved to Passaic, New Jersey and worked in the newspaper industry.

Death
Van Duzer died in Passaic, New Jersey on September 28, 1947. He was cremated and his ashes were scattered on the Humboldt River near Winnemucca, Nevada.

References

External links

Biographical Directory of the United States Congress
The Political Graveyard

1864 births
1947 deaths
People from Idaho City, Idaho
District attorneys in Nevada
Democratic Party members of the Nevada Assembly
Georgetown University Law Center alumni
University of Nevada, Reno alumni
People from Humboldt County, Nevada
Democratic Party members of the United States House of Representatives from Nevada